Þuríður Sturludóttir (1199–1238;;) was daughter of Icelandic chieftain Sturla Sighvatsson and Sólveig Sæmundsdóttir. Mother of Jón korpur Hrafnsson in whom the warring clans of Haraldur hárfagri (Harald Fairhair) and Egill Skallagrímsson were genetically united in Iceland in 1255.

The bloodline of Þuríður Sturludóttir from Haraldur hárfagri Hálfdánarson:
 Haraldur “Hárfagri” Hálfdánarson (850) – King in Norway
 Sigurður “Hrísi” Haraldsson (880)
 Hálfdán Sigurðsson (930)
 Sigurður “Sýr” Hálfdánarson (970)
 Haraldur “Harðráði” Sigurðsson (1047) – King in Norway
 Ólafur “Kyrri” Haraldsson (1066) – King in Norway
 Magnús “Berfættur” Ólafsson (1090) – King in Norway
 Þóra Magnúsdóttir (1100)
 Jón Loftsson (1124–1197)
 Sæmundur Jónsson (1154–1222)
 Sólveig Sæmundsdóttir (1200–1244)
 Þuríður Sturludóttir (1228–1288)

Sources
Islendingabók (Book of Icelanders): http://www.islendingabok.is
Konungasögur (Kings' sagas)
Egils saga Skallagrímssonar (Egils saga)

1199 births
1238 deaths
Thuridur Sturludottir
13th-century Icelandic women